Lodge is the only EP, and the fourth release from Beaver, released on Man's Ruin Records. It is out of print.

Track listing
 "Static" - 6:30
 "Tarmac" - 3:48
 "Repossessed" - 3:58
 "Interstate" - 6:50
 "I Reckon" - 7:07

Credits
Produced by Pidah & Beaver

Engineered and Mastered by Pieter Kloos

Edited by Jacques de Haard

Recorded at 'The Void' Eindhoven, Holland 1999

All songs by Beaver

References 

Beaver (band) albums
1999 albums
Man's Ruin Records albums